Julius Vincenz von Krombholz (19 December 1782 – 1 November 1843) was a physician and mycologist born in Oberpolitz (today Horní Police, Czech Republic), northern Bohemia.

He studied medicine at the University of Prague, receiving his doctorate in 1814. In 1828 he was appointed professor of special pathology and therapy. At Prague, he used his influence to help the penniless August Carl Joseph Corda (1809–1849) get admitted to the university. In 1831 he was named rector of the university.

Contributions 
In addition to his career in medicine, Krombholz had a keen interest in mycology. He performed numerous experiments involving the toxicity of mushrooms. He is known for Naturgetreue Abbildungen und Beschreibungen der essbaren, schädlichen und verdächtigen Schwämme (1831–1846), a publication on mushrooms that was based on his own observations. It is acclaimed for its true-to-nature pictures and its descriptions of edible, harmful and suspect mushrooms. Krombholz died before its completion, and latter parts of the work were edited by Johann Baptista Zobel (1812–1865). Other noted works by Krombholz include:
 Abhandlungen aus dem Gebiete der gesammten Akologie, zur Begründung eines Systems derselben, 1825.
 Anatomische Beschreibung eines sehr merkwurdigen Anencephalus (with three copperplates), 1830.
 General-Rapport über die asiatische Cholera zu Prag im Jahre 1831 und 1832 nach den in den Choleraspitälern gewonnenen Erfahrungen, 1836.

A number of mushrooms were first described by Krombholz. As such, the standard botanical author abbreviation Krombh. is applied to the scientific names of these species. The genus Krombhlolzia (synonym Zeugites) from the family Poaceae is named in his honor.

Illustrations from "Naturgetreue Abbildungen und Beschreibungen der essbaren"

References 
  Virtual cemeteries of Czech Republic, biographical information.

1782 births
1843 deaths
People from Česká Lípa District
People from the Kingdom of Bohemia
German Bohemian people
18th-century Bohemian people
19th-century Czech people
Czech mycologists
Charles University alumni
Rectors of Charles University